The Cold Springs Bridge is a 208-foot, single span Pegram truss bridge in Blaine County, Idaho. It provides  clearance above a roadbed below.

The Cold Springs Bridge was constructed in 1884 at the Snake River Crossing in Ontario, Oregon. In 1917, the bridge was disassembled and relocated to Blaine County, Idaho. It crosses the Big Wood River 2 miles south of Ketchum, Idaho. This bridge served the Union Pacific from 1936 to 1981 bringing skiers on luxury trains to Sun Valley, Idaho. In 1984, the Blaine County recreation district converted the bridge to pedestrian use. 

In 1997, the bridge was placed on the National Register of Historic Places.

References

Railroad bridges in Idaho
Truss bridges in the United States
Buildings and structures in Blaine County, Idaho
Railroad bridges on the National Register of Historic Places in Idaho
Transportation in Blaine County, Idaho
Former railway bridges in the United States
Pedestrian bridges in Idaho
Relocated buildings and structures in Idaho
National Register of Historic Places in Blaine County, Idaho